Parajotus is a genus of African jumping spiders that was first described by George and Elizabeth Peckham in 1903.  it contains only three species, found only in Africa: P. cinereus, P. obscurofemoratus, and P. refulgens. The name is a combination of the Ancient Greek "para", meaning "alongside", and the related genus Jotus.

References

External links
 Photograph of P. cinereus

Salticidae genera
Salticidae
Spiders of Africa